Crockett County Consolidated Common School District is a public school district based in the community of Ozona, Texas (USA). The district's boundaries parallel that of Crockett County.

In 2009, the school district was rated "academically acceptable" by the Texas Education Agency.

Schools
Ozona High School (Grades 9-12)
Ozona Middle (Grades 6-8)
Ozona Intermediate (Grades 3-5)
Ozona Primary (Grades PK-2)

References

External links

Crockett County Consolidated CSD

School districts in Crockett County, Texas